Meryl Tankard  is an Australian dancer and choreographer who has a wide national and international reputation.

Early life and education
Tankard's father served in the Royal Australian Air Force and the family moved to various bases during her early years. She was born in Darwin, but had her first dance lessons in Melbourne. Several years later the family moved to Penang, Malaysia and was influenced by Malaysia's colour and ceremony. Later, living near Newcastle, New South Wales, Tankard took classes in Newcastle and then in Sydney before entering the Australian Ballet School in 1974.

Career 
Tankard's professional career began as a dancer with the Australian Ballet at the end of 1975. She also choreographed her first work, Birds behind Bars, for a choreographic workshop program, Dance Horizons, in 1977.

Tankard's early successes as a performer came when she worked in Germany with Pina Bausch and her Tanztheater Wuppertal between 1978 and 1984; Tankard was a principal artist and toured extensively. Meryl created roles in Cafe Muller, Kontakhof, Arien, Keuscheitslegende, 1980, Bandoneon, Walzer. In 1980 she played the leading role in the movie Quackfurdonald Mit Lieben Gruss, filmed in Munich and Disneyland and screened on German television. In 1982 she co-wrote and performed in Sydney on the Wupper, a short film awarded the Silver Film Band for Best Short Film at the 1983 Berlin Film Festival.

She then spent several years between Australia and Europe. In Europe she was a guest performer with Bausch's company as well as performing in Lindsay Kemp's Company. In Australia in 1984 she made Echo Point, and in 1986 performed in Robyn Archer's television production of The Pack of Women for ABC TV and played co-lead in the ABC TV series Dancing Daze, produced by Jan Chapman. In 1986 she created Travelling Light. In 1988 she created and performed solo her full-length Two Feet, which marked a major turning point in the creative collaboration she had established with photographer and visual artist Regis Lansac who created visual projections to accompany Two Feet and continued to develop this aspect of their collaboration.

In 1989 Tankard was offered the directorship of a small company in Canberra, Australian Capital Territory, which she named the Meryl Tankard Company. Works in Canberra included Banshee (1989), VX18504 (1989), Nuti (1990), Kikimora (1990), Court of Flora (1990), Chants de Mariage I and II (1991–1992), and Songs with Mara (1992). Tankard also revived Echo Point and Two Feet, collaborated with the theatre director Pierre Bokor on Circo (1991), and created choreography for Opera Australia's Death in Venice (1989), and made Sloth as part of Seven Deadly Sins - a program by seven contemporary Australian choreographers filmed for television by the ABC in 1993.

She moved to Adelaide, South Australia as Director of Australian Dance Theatre. Tankard created Furioso (1993), Aurora (1994), Possessed (1995), Rasa (1996), Seulle (1997) and Inuk (1997). She also choreographed The Deep End (1996) for the Australian Ballet and Orphee et Euridyce for Opera Australia. Under Tankard's leadership, Australian Dance Theatre toured extensively worldwide. It was the first Australian company to be invited to perform at the prestigious Brooklyn Academy of Music in New York.

Tankard left Adelaide in 1999 and began a career as a freelance choreographer. Her commissions have included: 
1998 = Bolero for the Lyon Opera Ballet; 
2000 = choreography for[The Beautiful Game (musical) for Andrew Lloyd Webber on London's Westend; 
2001 = a commission by Tiffany & Co. at New York's Museum of National History;
2002 = a commission by the Sydney 2000 Olympic Games to create Deep Sea Dreaming for the opening ceremony; 
2002 = Ocean Dance to honour the Dalai Lama in tribute concert Sydney Opera House and Merryland  for Netherlands Dance Theatre 3
2003 = Pearl for the thirtieth birthday celebrations of the Sydney Opera House and [
2003 = 'Wild Swans' for the Australian Ballet and the Sydney Opera House, a full-length work based on a Hans Christian Andersen fairy story to a new score by Elena Kats-Chernin
2004 = @North, for the Berlin Ballet and Petrouchka for Netherlands Dance Theatre 1 in The Hague
2006 = choreography for "Tarzan" for Disney on Broadway, New York
2007 = created "Kaidan" for the Sydney Festival and Sydney Opera House with TaikOz
2008 = created "Inuk 2" for Sydney Dance Company
2009 = "The Oracle" for Sydney Opera House and Malthouse Melbourne
In 2010, Tankard gained a graduate diploma in film directing from Australian Film, Television and Radio School and directed two short films, Moth and Mad.
2011 = "Cinderella" for Leipzig Ballet with Gewandhaus Orchestra
2015 = Directed and co-produced Michelle's Story, 29min documentary (commissioned by ABC TV and Adelaide Film Festival). Awards for Michelle's Story - Adel Film Festival Audience Award for Best Documentary, Screen South Australia Award for Best Short Film, Best documentary, Best Soundtrack. Aust Dance Award - Most Outstanding Dance film.
 2016 = Performed MCA
 2016 = Directed and choreographed Andrew Lloyd Webber’s The Beautiful Game at WAAPA Perth
 2018 = Performed and created - Meet Meryl and Jo in Bonn Germany - Pina Bausch Retrospective
 2018 = Choreographed Camille Claude for Theatre de l’Athenee Paris
 2018 = Remounted Furioso for Royal Ballet of Flanders Antwerp, Gent - Belgium
 2019 = Produced Two Feet film of original production with Meryl Tankard screened at IMZ Dance on Screen Festival Wuppertal
 2019 = Created Two Feet for Adelaide Festival with Natalia Osipova 
 2019 = Created Zizanie for Adelaide Festival for Restless Dance Theatre

 Awards 
2019 = Officer of the Order of Australia (AO)
2016 = Recipient of the Jim Bettison & Helen James Award
2010 = Outstanding Choreography award Australian Dance Awards for The Oracle
2004 = Creative Fellowship Australia Council
2001 = Centenary Medal
2002 = Lifetime Achievement award Australian Dance Awards
2000 = Helpmann Award for Costume Design for Deep Sea dreaming for Olympic Games Opening Ceremony 2000
2000 = Nomination for Laurence Olivier Award for Best Theatre Choreographer Beautiful Game1998 = Mobil Pegasus Award for Best Production "Inuk' Summer Festival Hamburg
1995 = The Age Performing Arts Award (dance) for Best Collaboration for Orpheus and Euridice with Australian Opera
1994 = Betty Pounder Award for Original Choreography for "Nuti"
1994 = Victorian Green Room Awards for Dance Direction, Design, Management for "Nuti and Kikimora"
1993 = Victorian Green Room Award for Female Dancer in leading role "Two Feet"
1993 = Sidney Myer Performing Arts Award for Individual Achievement
1992 = Canberran of the Year
1983 = Silver Bear for Best Short Film Berlin Film Festival "Sydney an der Wupper"

References

 Further reading 

 
  biography
 
 "Meryl Tankard interviewed by Martin Portus, 21 September 2016". State Library of New South Wales Catalogue''.

Australian ballerinas
Australian choreographers
Ballet choreographers
Living people
 Meryl Tankard
Australian Ballet School alumni
Helpmann Award winners
Officers of the Order of Australia
Year of birth missing (living people)